Arthur McBain is a British screen actor and children's author. He played Alex Myer in ITV's The Trouble with Maggie Cole and Snowy Fleet, in the ABC television series Friday On My Mind. His debut children's book In The Dead Of The Night was published by Little Hare books in 2019.

Acting career 
McBain began his career in the Royal Shakespeare Company and National Theatre of Scotland's production of Dunsinane by David Greig. In 2017, McBain played Gordon 'Snowy' Fleet in ABC's television series Friday On My Mind, which tells the story of Australian rock band The Easybeats, before joining the cast of Rupert Goold's film Judy. 

In 2019 McBain was cast as Alex Myer in ITV's The Trouble with Maggie Cole. 

In 2023, McBain played Jean-Baptiste Marchand in Ridley Scott's film Napoleon.

Books 
Arthur McBain's first children's book, In The Dead Of The Night, Illustrated by Tom Knight, was released in 2019. His second book, Night of the Living Pasta, is released in 2023 and is illustrated by Chrissie Krebbs.

Filmography

References

External links 
 Arthur McBain on IMDb

British actors
Year of birth missing (living people)
Living people